Gunnar Svendsen (9 October 1915 – 11 January 1984) was a Norwegian sport shooter. He was born in Fredrikstad. He competed at the 1948 Summer Olympics in London, and at the 1952 Summer Olympics in Helsinki.

References

1915 births
1984 deaths
Sportspeople from Fredrikstad
Norwegian male sport shooters
Olympic shooters of Norway
Shooters at the 1948 Summer Olympics
Shooters at the 1952 Summer Olympics
20th-century Norwegian people